Philip Lasser (born August 4, 1963) is an American composer, pianist, and music theorist. He is a member of the faculty at the Juilliard School in New York City.

Career and contributions
Lasser was born in New York City and began taking piano lessons at the age of five. At age sixteen, he entered the Ecole d'Arts Americaines in the Palace of Fontainebleau, France. He studied at Harvard University and, following receipt of a Bachelor's degree, he lived in Paris from 1985 to 1988.

In 1988 Lasser entered Columbia University for a Master's degree in Composition, then entered Juilliard, receiving a degree in Doctor of Musical Arts. He wrote an academic work on the contrapuntal analysis of music entitled The Spiraling Tapestry, published by Rassel Editions. His piece Twelve Variations on a Chorale by J. S. Bach has been recorded by pianist Simone Dinnerstein on the Telarc record label.

Lasser is president of the European American Musical Alliance. As director of EAMA's Summer Music Programs in Paris since its 1996 inception, he promotes the pedagogical training of young musicians. Notable alumni of this program include musical theatre composer Erin Murray Quinlan.

Lasser became a faculty member of Juilliard in 1994. In 2006 he received the Walter Hinrichsen Award from the American Academy and Institute of Arts and Letters. He previously received the National Orchestral Association's New Music Orchestral Project, and the Louis B. Mayer Award for operatic endeavors. He has been composer-in-residence at the Camargo Foundation in Cassis, France, and at the Yaddo Colony.

Partial list of compositions
Orchestral
 So Says the Wind for string orchestra (2004)
 Manchester Miniature for string orchestra (2001)
 Circle of Dreams (2000)
 Southern Landscapes (1998)
 Prelude and Double Fugue in G Minor (1995)

Concertante
 The Circle and the Child for piano and orchestra (2012)
 Vocalise for violin and string orchestra (2000)
 Ballade for violin and string orchestra (1999)
 3 Counterpoints on Preludes and Fugues from the Well-Tempered Klavier for violin and orchestra (1998)

Chamber music
 Sonapartita for solo violin (2009)
 Ballade for flute and string quartet (2008)
 Chaconne Variations for violin and piano (2008)
 Childhood Suite for solo guitar (2004)
 Sonata for cello and piano (2003)
 Trio in F for violin, cello and piano (2003)
 Vocalise for violin (or viola, or cello) and quartet (arr.) (2003)
 Manchester Miniature for string quartet (2001)
 Into Evening for trombone and harp (2001)
 La Boite de Bijoux for violin and piano (2000)
 Vocalise for violin and piano (arr.) (1999)
 Berceuse Fantasque for violin and piano (1996)
 Sonata for solo viola (1996)
 String Quartet No.1 (1994)
 Counterpoints to the Well-Tempered Klavier for flute, clarinet, violin, viola, or cello and keyboard

Piano
 Still Life in Toccata Style (2005)
 Twelve Variations on a Chorale by J.S. Bach (2002)
 Sonata "Les Hiboux Blancs" (1996)
 Prelude "From Winter to Spring" (1994)

Vocal
 Nicolette et Aucassin for two sopranos, narrator and piano (2008)
 License of Love for mezzo-soprano and piano (2002)
 Les Couleurs de la Vie for soprano and piano (2000)
 Lonely in Eden for mezzo-soprano and piano (1999)
 Parisian Evening for soprano and piano (1999)
 Les Visage de l’Amour for soprano and piano (1998)

Choral
 The Dream Keeper for mixed chorus and chamber orchestra (2006)
 Sing Christmas! for mixed chorus and piano (2001)
 Kaddish for the Six Million for double mixed chorus, cello and cantor (2000)
 B’chol Dor Vador for mixed chorus and piano (1999)
 Esai Esa, Psalm 121 for baritone and mixed chorus (1987)

References

1963 births
Living people
American male classical composers
American classical composers
Juilliard School faculty
Harvard University alumni
Musicians from New York City
Columbia University School of the Arts alumni
Juilliard School alumni
20th-century classical composers
21st-century classical composers
21st-century American composers
20th-century American composers
Educators from New York City
Classical musicians from New York (state)
20th-century American male musicians
21st-century American male musicians